Central Garage, originally Snyder's Tin and Hardware Shop, is a historic commercial structure located in Orleans in Jefferson County, New York. It was built in 1902. It is a two-storey, frame, rectangular building characterized by its retrained Classical Revival styling and sheet metal sheathing. It was converted from use as a shop to a garage in the 1930s.

It was listed on the National Register of Historic Places in 1996.

References

Commercial buildings on the National Register of Historic Places in New York (state)
Neoclassical architecture in New York (state)
Commercial buildings completed in 1902
National Register of Historic Places in Jefferson County, New York
Transportation buildings and structures in Jefferson County, New York